Joseph "Quaker Meadows" McDowell Jr. (February 15, 1756July 11, 1801) was an American planter, soldier, and statesman from North Carolina. He was known as "Quaker Meadows Joe" to distinguish him from his cousin Joseph "Pleasant Gardens" McDowell, who was also a legislator and American Revolutionary War officer from North Carolina. The two men are not always clearly distinguished in historical records; both were in the 1780 Battle of Kings Mountain, one as a major in the Burke County Regiment of the North Carolina militia, and the other in a subordinate role as a captain.

Early life
McDowell was born in Winchester in the Virginia Colony on February 15, 1756.  His parents were Joseph McDowell, Sr. (1715–1771) who was a Scotch Irish immigrant and Virginia Margaret O'Neil (1717–1790) who was Irish.  The family moved to Rowan County, North Carolina in 1758.  He grew up on his family's estate, "Quaker Meadows", in Rowan County, North Carolina (in the area that became Burke County in 1777).

Congressional service
He was a delegate to the Hillsborough Convention in 1788 and the Fayetteville Convention in 1789 that approved the U.S. Constitution for North Carolina.  McDowell served in the 5th United States Congress from 1797 to 1799. He is sometimes credited as also having served in the 3rd United States Congress (1793–1795), but according to the Biographical Directory of the United States Congress, it was his cousin, Joseph "Pleasant Gardens" McDowell, who served at that time.   His son Joseph J. McDowell also served in Congress.

Military service
He served in the North Carolina militia during the American Revolution.
 Major in the 2nd Rowan County Regiment of the North Carolina militia (1776-1777)
 Major in the Burke County Regiment of the North Carolina militia (1777-1781)
 Lt. Colonel in the Burke County Regiment of the North Carolina militia (1781-1782)
 Colonel over the Burke County Regiment of the North Carolina militia (1782-1783)

Known engagements that he participated in included:
 April 10–20, 1779 Chickamauga Towns
 June 20, 1779, Battle of Stono Ferry, South Carolina
 July 15, 1780, Earle's Ford, South Carolina
 June 20, 1780, Battle of Ramseur's Mill
 August 18, 1780, Battle of Musgrove's Mill, South Carolina
 September 12, 1780, Battle of Cane Creek/Lindley's Mill
 October 8, 1780, Battle of Kings Mountain, South Carolina
 January 17, 1781, Battle of Cowpens, South Carolina
 1782, Cherokee Expedition

Death
McDowell died July 11, 1801 in Burke County, North Carolina.  He was buried at the Quaker Meadows Cemetery, Morganton, Burke County, North Carolina.

References

Dictionary of American Biography
Purcell, L. Edward. Who Was Who in the American Revolution. New York: Facts on File, 1993. .

North Carolina militiamen in the American Revolution
Politicians from Winchester, Virginia
American planters
1756 births
1801 deaths
American people of Irish descent
American people of Scotch-Irish descent
Democratic-Republican Party members of the United States House of Representatives from North Carolina
People from Burke County, North Carolina
18th-century American politicians
American slave owners